Oriol 'Uri' Santos Ferrés (born 29 October 1986) is a Spanish footballer who plays for UE Tona as a forward.

Club career
Born in Olot, Girona, Catalonia, Santos graduated from local UE Olot's youth system, but left in January 2006 to sign with amateurs CF Peralada. He first arrived in Segunda División B in that year after joining UE Figueres, and represented fellow league club Girona FC in the 2007–08 season, scoring just twice in 33 games for both teams combined.

In September 2008 Santos moved to Racing de Santander, being initially assigned to the reserves also in the third level. On 3 May 2009 he made his first-team – and La Liga – debut, playing the last nine minutes in the 0–2 home loss against UD Almería.

In the 2010 summer, free agent Santos signed with UE Llagostera in Tercera División. He achieved promotion at the first attempt, contributing with ten goals in 36 matches.

On 6 June 2012 Santos returned to his first club Olot, also in the fourth level.

References

External links
 
 Futbolme profile  
 
 Uri Santos at La Preferente

1986 births
Living people
Spanish footballers
Footballers from Catalonia
Association football forwards
La Liga players
Segunda División B players
Tercera División players
UE Olot players
CF Peralada players
UE Figueres footballers
Girona FC players
Rayo Cantabria players
Racing de Santander players
UE Costa Brava players
Girona FC B players
Catalonia international footballers